Fresh is a 1994 American crime drama film written and directed by Boaz Yakin in his directorial debut, also produced by Randy Ostrow and Lawrence Bender. It was scored by Stewart Copeland, a member of The Police. The story revolves around a preteen boy named Michael, nicknamed Fresh (portrayed by Sean Nelson), who runs drugs for gangsters. Inspired by the chess lessons of his father, an alcoholic speed-chess master (Samuel L. Jackson), Fresh devises and executes a brilliant plan to extricate himself and his drug-addicted sister (N'Bushe Wright) from their hopeless lives.

Marketed as a hip hop 'hood film, Fresh went relatively unnoticed by the public, but won critical acclaim. Critics praised the film for offering a realistic glimpse of life in New York City's projects during the crack epidemic. "There's shocking resonance to the notion of a grade-school boy who's become a criminal out of sheer pragmatism," wrote Entertainment Weekly's Owen Gleiberman.

Plot

Twelve-year-old Michael a.k.a. "Fresh" stops at a Latina woman's apartment to pick up dime bags of heroin before he goes to school. Fresh notices that she has given him the wrong amount, trying to swindle him out of his delivery. Fresh warns her that his boss Esteban will be angry with the incorrect amount. The woman, a drug addict, "finds" the missing bag. He leaves, disgusted. 

Next, he visits another apartment where several women and one man, Herbie, are measuring and cutting bricks of heroin. Herbie insults Fresh and makes crude comments about Fresh's sister, which angers Fresh. He rushes out because he is late for school. He meets up with another of Esteban's employees to count the drugs. The employee tells Fresh that Esteban wants to see him after handing Fresh his share of the money.

Fresh arrives late at school where he is  scolded by his teacher, Mrs. Coleman. At recess, Fresh and his best friend, Chuckie, watch the girls' cheerleading team and Fresh talks to one of them, Rosie. After school, Fresh goes to a wooded, abandoned area. In a secret hiding place where he stashes his earnings, his savings now come to a substantial amount. From there, he goes to his grandmother's house where his aunt and eleven cousins live.

The next morning, Fresh is selling drugs when a desperate drug addict offers sex to Fresh in exchange for drugs, but he sends her away. At the end of the day, Jake, one of the lookouts, becomes angry and threatens to kill Kermit who didn't show up to pay $50 Kermit owes him. Fresh seeks out Corky — his boss as well as Jake's — in order to get paid but Corky tries to short him. Fresh demands more money since the lookouts like Jake make $50, while his pay is $100 for selling the drugs. Corky agrees.

Fresh takes the subway to Washington Square to play chess for cash with a man who is undefeated while his father Sam, a skilled chess player, sits at another table watching him. After winning, Fresh plays his father but loses. Fresh visits Chuckie, who proposes to enter their dog, Roscoe, in a dogfight to earn cash and urges Fresh to get him a job with Esteban. Fresh leaves him to visit Esteban, who is annoyed that Fresh is selling crack for other drug dealers. Fresh leaves Esteban to go where his sister Nichole works. He bumps into James, Nichole's drug-dealing boyfriend. Fresh warns Nichole that Esteban is interested in her. She tells him that she doesn't like the way Esteban looks at her "like a queen" and that she doesn't love James either, only the drugs he gives her.

Fresh goes to watch a neighborhood basketball game, where Jake begins to show jealously towards a smaller kid, Curtis. During the game Curtis humiliates Jake by scoring the winning basket. As Rosie sees Fresh and walks over to talk to him, Jake fatally shoots Curtis. Everyone leaves except Fresh. He walks past Curtis' corpse and finds Rosie on the ground, choking on blood, having been struck in the neck by a stray bullet and dies. The police arrive shortly, demanding information which Fresh refuses to provide.

Next day, Fresh plays chess with his father Sam again who scolds him for being distracted. Fresh loses but is able to put his Father's king in "check" for the 1st time. Later, Chuckie and Fresh arrive at the dogfight. Their dog wins. Chuckie wants to enter him into another fight but Fresh stops him, agreeing to get him a job with Esteban. They go to Esteban's apartment where Esteban and Nichole are finishing having sex. Esteban dismisses Chuckie after Chuckie boasts of "busting those dope moves". Esteban tells Fresh that he plans to groom Fresh to be his protege and wants Fresh to stop selling for other dealers.

Meanwhile, Corky has the police's attention since Jake's shooting. Fresh takes his own savings to a cocaine source, Hector (Anthony Ruiz), under the pretense of being the runner for Corky. Hector refuses to hand over the drugs to Fresh. Fresh threatens him and offers him a big sum of cash - the entirety of Fresh's personal savings. Hector takes the cash and tells Fresh where to pick up the drugs. Fresh says that the police have wire-tapped Corky's phone numbers and tells Hector not to call Corky.

At school, Chuckie can't resist bragging about his supposed new job for Esteban. After school, he and Fresh buy science textbooks to hide the drugs. During the trip back, Chuckie almost gets arrested on the train for talking back to an officer, but Fresh deescalates the situation. They go to an abandoned house where Fresh is replacing their Heroin stash with Hector's Cocaine, while Chuckie keeps lookout thinking he's just there to hide it. When leaving, three armed men step out from behind the corner. Chuckie shoots at the men and runs, but trips. The gun falls under a car's tire. Chuckie tries to grab it but the tire is shot and it flattens over Chuckie's left hand, crushing it. Fresh runs back over to help him, to no avail, and Fresh runs away. The assailants kill Chuckie. Fresh is questioned by the police at the police station, but is let go.

Back at home, Fresh's aunt tells him that she cannot risk the lives of her eleven other children for him and informs him that he will be sent to a group home. At school, Fresh's friends blame him for Chuckie's death and now truly alone, Fresh kills Chuckie's dog. When Fresh goes outside, Jake forces him in the car with the three assailants, revealing that Jake was behind the ambush on the kids. They bring Fresh to Corky who is upset with Chuckie's bragging about moving base for Esteban - the same drugs that Corky is selling - and that Esteban is encroaching on his product. The drugs that Jake and the assailants took from Chuckie's bag reveal that both Fresh and Chuckie were carrying crack cocaine. Corky threatens to kill Fresh to send a message to rival dealers.

Fresh lies, stating he was being forced to sell for Jake. An astonished Jake pulls out his gun to shoot Fresh, but Corky's henchmen turn on Jake and Jake's friend, Red, who try to convince everyone that Fresh is lying. Fresh insists that Jake and Red were planning to oust Corky and he was only saying that he was selling for Esteban as protection. Fresh tells them to call Hector, who will reveal the truth. Corky calls Hector. The conversation is short, with Hector expressing concern over Corky's phone being wire-tapped, as Hector was told by Fresh. Corky then kills Red and Jake. Corky turns to Fresh and asks who else is involved. Fresh names James.

Fresh then goes to Esteban's warehouse and tells him that Corky's crew had jumped him and that Corky is planning to sell heroin as well. He tells Esteban that Corky's distributor is James and the two are planning to meet that night. He adds that Nichole is seeing James secretly because James is plotting with Corky to take Esteban out. Corky and his men arrive at James' place and storm in while Esteban, Fresh, and two other men wait in Esteban's car. Inside, Esteban's crew kills James, Corky, and Corky's men. 

Afterwards, they drive to Esteban's place and Esteban sees Nichole is there. He tells his henchmen to take Fresh home. Fresh makes them stop the car and he leaves. He runs into a convenience store and makes a phone call. He then shows up at Esteban's apartment. Esteban lets him stay because he wants to confront Fresh for telling Nichole that he found her father in Staten Island and for urging her to leave for a rehabilitation center.

Angry, Esteban demands to know what else Fresh is hiding from him. The police arrive and as Esteban goes to answer the door, Fresh hides something under the bed. The police officer turns out to be Sgt. Perez, responding to a call about a domestic dispute, presumably the call Fresh made before he visited Esteban. Esteban denies any argument. Fresh comes forward and tells Perez that Esteban is a drug dealer who killed James, Corky, and several others earlier that night, and his sister is scared to speak up since he is now threatening her. Sgt. Perez checks under the bed and finds Esteban's gun, which he removed from the car after the shooting earlier, and the drugs Fresh planted. The police take Esteban away. Sgt. Perez promises witness protection for Fresh and his sister.

The movie concludes with Fresh meeting his father again to play chess. His father berates him for being late and antagonizes Fresh before their game. Fresh's father looks up and sees Fresh sobbing, with tears quietly streaming down his face.

Cast

Reception 
Upon release, Fresh received critical acclaim. On Rotten Tomatoes the film has an approval rating of 88% based on reviews from 40 critics, with an average rating of 7.61/10. The site's consensus reads: "Well cast and sharply directed, Fresh serves as an attention-getting calling card for writer-director Boaz Yakin as well as a gripping urban drama."

Janet Maslin of The New York Times commended the "thoughtfulness of [Boaz] Yakin's direction" and wrote that he "doesn't include many violent episodes in this film, but the ones he stages are made so meaningful that their impact is brutalizingly intense." She complimented Adam Holender's cinematography and commented that he makes the film "extraordinarily handsome, with a sharply sunlit look that brings out the hard edges in its urban landscapes. The subject and visual style could not be more forcefully matched."

Although he did not find its second half believable, Owen Gleiberman of Entertainment Weekly gave the film a B rating and called Nelson a "wondrous young actor". James Berardinelli called Jackson's supporting role "an example of an actor at his most focused" and called Fresh "an atypical thriller -- a film that succeeds because it defies many conventions of its genre." Roger Ebert of the Chicago Sun-Times gave the film four out of four stars and called it "a movie filled with drama and excitement, unfolding a plot of brilliant complexity". He praised Nelson's performance as "extraordinary" and found its plot "focused and perceptive", praising it for its social commentary:

Other reviews of the film are more critical, suggesting that the main character Fresh becomes less human, and more of a product of the screenwriters as the film progresses in its second half.

The film won the Filmmaker's Trophy at the 1994 Sundance Film Festival. In 1995, Nelson won the Best Debut Performance at the Independent Spirit Awards.

Year-end lists 
 3rd – Yardena Arar, Los Angeles Daily News
 3rd – David Elliott, The San Diego Union-Tribune
 6th – Roger Ebert, Chicago Sun Times
 7th – Desson Howe, The Washington Post
 9th – Steve Persall, St. Petersburg Times
 9th – Sandi Davis, The Oklahoman
 Top 9 (not ranked) – Dan Webster, The Spokesman-Review
 Top 10 (not ranked) – George Meyer, The Ledger
 Best "sleepers" (not ranked) – Dennis King, Tulsa World
 Honorable mention – Michael MacCambridge, Austin American-Statesman
 Honorable mention – Howie Movshovitz, The Denver Post
 Honorable mention – Duane Dudek, Milwaukee Sentinel
 Honorable mention – Bob Carlton, The Birmingham News
 Honorable mention – Jeff Simon, The Buffalo News

Soundtrack
A soundtrack album was released on August 30, 1994 by RCA Records. It featured three songs by the Wu-Tang Clan and nine songs by old school hip hop artists, including The Cold Crush Brothers, Whodini, and Grandmaster Flash and the Furious Five. Allmusic editor Chris Witt gave the soundtrack album four-and-a-half out of five stars and noted its old school tracks as the highlights, writing that "The contrast between the life and color of the old school tracks and the unrelenting gloom of the Wu-Tang cuts, produced over ten years later, suggests that hip-hop may have lost something in the intervening years."

See also 

 List of hood films

References

Bibliography

External links
 
 
 

1994 films
1994 crime drama films
1990s hip hop films
American crime drama films
African-American films
1994 directorial debut films
Films about chess
Films about the illegal drug trade
Films set in New York City
Films directed by Boaz Yakin
Films produced by Lawrence Bender
Films scored by Stewart Copeland
Films with screenplays by Boaz Yakin
Hood films
Miramax films
Sundance Film Festival award winners
1994 independent films
American independent films
1990s English-language films
1990s American films